Alkalicoccus chagannorensis is a Gram-positive, moderately halophilic and spore-forming bacterium from the genus of Alkalicoccus which has been isolated from the Lake Chagannor from the Inner Mongolia.

References

Bacillaceae
Bacteria described in 2007